Spring on Leper's Island is a 1940 Japanese drama film directed by Shirō Toyoda. It is based on the memoir of Masako Ogawa, a Japanese doctor who specialised in leprosy treatment, and is noted by film historians for its humanist and compassionate theme in contrast to the militarist national film policy at the time.

Plot
Mrs. Koyama, a young female doctor working at the Nagashima Aiseien Sanatorium, travels the islands of the Seto Inland Sea to talk leprosy patients into moving to the sanatorium where they can be treated and live together with other people affected by the disease. Many patients and their relatives are reluctant to the move; while family father Yokogawa is still trying to work to support his wife and children, others are hiding in their family's homes or in deserted shacks. In the end, Yokogawa gives in to the doctor's advice and follows her to the sanatorium. His saddened and angered son Kenzo watches his departure by boat from the island's harbour.

Cast
 Shizue Natsukawa as Mrs. Koyama
 Ichirō Sugai as Yokogawa
 Haruko Sugimura as Yokogawa's wife
 Yōtarō Katsumi as mayor
 Kan Hayashi as Horiguchi
 Yuriko Hanabusa as Horiguchi's wife
 Fudeko Tanaka as landlady
 Meiko Nakamura as Kiyoko
 Ken Mitsuda as Miyata
 Misako Shimizu as Toshi
 Shiro Mizutani as Kenzo

Historical background
Spring on Leper’s Island was compliant with Japan's public health policy and its Leprosy Prevention Laws (last widened in 1931), which saw the increasing segregation of leprosy patients from their communities, a growing number of sanatoria where they were hospitalised, and the launching of the No Leprosy Patients in Our Prefecture (muraiken undō) campaign which Ogawa advocated. The film received a recommendation by Japan's Ministry Of Education.

Awards
 1941 Kinema Junpo Award for Best Film of the Year

References

External links
 
 

1940 films
Japanese drama films
Japanese black-and-white films
Films based on books
Films based on biographies
Films directed by Shirō Toyoda